Episteme  is a genus of moths of the family Noctuidae. The genus was erected by Jacob Hübner in 1820. Species are widespread.

Description
Palpi upturned, where the terminal joint long and naked. Antennae simple and dilated. Forewings with vein 5 from near angle of cell, vein 6 from upper angle, and veins 7 to 10 stalked. Hindwings with vein 5 from the center of discocellulars.

Species
 Episteme adulatrix Kollar, [1844]
 Episteme arctopsa Chou & Chen, 1962
 Episteme beatrix Jordan, 1909
 Episteme bisma Moore, [1858]
 Episteme connexa Walker, 1856
 Episteme conspicua Rothschild, 1896
 Episteme hebe Jordan, 1912
 Episteme latimargo Hampson, 1891
 Episteme lectrix Linnaeus, 1764
 Episteme macrosema Jordan, 1912
 Episteme maculatrix Duncan & Westwood, 1841
 Episteme mundina Jordan, 1912
 Episteme negrita Hampson, 1894
 Episteme nigripennis Butler, 1875
 Episteme nipalensis Butler, 1875
 Episteme sumatrana Rothschild, 1899
 Episteme sumbana Rothschild, 1897
 Episteme vetula Geyer, 1832

References

 
 

Agaristinae